Pseudostomatella clathratula is a species of small sea snail, a marine gastropod mollusk in the family Trochidae, the top snails.

Description
The imperforate shell has a turbinate-depressed shape. Its spire is a little elevated. The convex whorls are transversely lirate, articulated with red, and crenulated. The interstices are closely latticed. The umbilical region is impressed. The thick columella is reflexed. The aperture is moderate, rounded and pearly within.

Distribution
This marine species is endemic to Australia and occurs off Western Australia in the Northwest Shelf Province.

References

 Adams, H. & Adams, A. 1854. The genera of Recent Mollusca arranged according to their organization. London : John Van Voorst Vol. 1 pp. 257–484
 Pilsbry, H.A. 1890. Manual of Conchology. Philadelphia : Academy of Natural Sciences Philadelphia Vol. 12 323 pp., 65 pls.
 Hedley, C. 1916. A preliminary index of the Mollusca of Western Australia. Journal and Proceedings of the Royal Society of Western Australia 1: 152–226

clathratula
Gastropods of Australia
Gastropods described in 1854